Prityka is a rural locality (a selo) in Mikhaylovsky Selsoviet, Burlinsky District, Altai Krai, Russia. The population was 277 as of 2013. It was founded in 1923. There are 2 streets.

Geography 
Prityka is located near the Burla river, 10 km southwest of Burla (the district's administrative centre) by road. Mikhaylovka is the nearest rural locality.

References 

Rural localities in Burlinsky District